The City Blacksmith Shop or Hanzlik Blacksmith Shop in Lamberton in the U.S. state of Minnesota is located at Douglas Street and 2nd Avenue. The building was built by George Nigg Senior and Paul Schaffran in 1897. They smithed until they sold the shop to Anton Hanzlik in 1920. Many of the trade tools are still in the building, however some have been modernized with electricity.

References

External links

Blacksmith shops
Buildings and structures in Redwood County, Minnesota
Commercial buildings completed in 1898
Historic American Engineering Record in Minnesota
Industrial buildings and structures on the National Register of Historic Places in Minnesota
1898 establishments in Minnesota
National Register of Historic Places in Redwood County, Minnesota
Metalworking